{
  "type": "FeatureCollection",
  "features": [
    {
      "type": "Feature",
      "properties": {},
      "geometry": {
        "type": "Point",
        "coordinates": [
          8.918333,
          45.578056
        ]
      }
    }
  ]
}
The Legnano Frogs established in 1977, are an American football team from the city of Legnano, in the Metropolitan City of Milan, in Lombardy, Italy. It has black and silver as its social colors, while it has a frog as a symbol, hence the name of the team.
 
In 2023, The Frogs will be back playing at the top level of the Italian Football League IFL.

Among the most successful American football teams in Italy, they were European champions in 1989 (with two participations in the Eurobowl), won six Italian Football League titles (with 11 participations in the Italian Bowl) and a Coppa Italia Bowl (1993). The youth team has won two Youngbowls (1991, 1992).

History

The team was founded by a group of boys from Gallarate in 1977. They decided to practice this sport after seeing it while vacationing in the United States.

The founders organized three small teams, with reference to as many bars in the area. From the spring of 1978 one of these teams, called Frogs (in reference to the 1972 horror film Frogs) from the Bianchi bar, who had gone there for work, began training with the Pink Panthers of Piacenza.

In Piacenza there were several players from the NATO base who taught the children the fundamentals of the sport. From the Pink Panthers, the Rhinos Milano was formed, one of the most important Italian football teams.

From 1978 to 1980, the Frogs played many friendlies, also participating in tournaments organized in NATO bases. Among the games played there was the first official match played between Italian American football teams in preparation for the first championship officially recognized by the federation; played on 24 June 1978 at the Stadio Carlo Speroni in Busto Arsizio, it was won 36–0 by the Rhinos Milano over the Gallarate Frogs.

In 1981, the first official championship was organized by the Italian American Football Association, consisting of five teams: the Frogs, the Rhinos Milano, the Jaguars Turin, the Rams Milano and the Eagles Ferrara. In 1984 the team moved to Busto Arsizio and changed its name to Busto Arsizio Frogs. In 1984 the Frogs beat an American team for the first time, the Derby Rangers of the NATO Naval Air Station in Tirrenia, 7–0.

In 1987 the Frogs were close to being absorbed by the Milano Seamen. However, it was decided by president Ulrico Lucarelli to move the team to Legnano and merge with the local Legnano Vikings instead. On this occasion the team changed its name to Legnano Frogs.

In 2001 the team moved to Milan and changed its name to Milano Frogs, while in 2002 they merged with the Kings Gallarate, moving the headquarters to Gallarate and changing its name to Gallarate Frogs. In 2003 the team returned to Legnano and changed its name back to Legnano Frogs.

In 2004 the Blue Storms Gorla Minore was formed from a corporate split and the Legnano Frogs did not participate in the championships. Following the 2008 federal demerger, they enrolled in the NFLI, later merging into the FIF; in these seasons the team has always taken part in the top league of their home federation, reaching the semi-final on two occasions.

In November 2010 they announced that they had applied for affiliation with FIDAF and signed up for the LENAF championship, in which they played from the year following 2016 (but never managed to reach the playoffs).

In 2017 they suspended their operations to carry out a major restructuring and did not participate in the championships. In 2018 they returned to participate in the Second Division championship, the second level of the Italian American football championship.

In 2023, After a long absence, the Frogs will be back playing in the top level of the Italian Football League IFL.

Name
 Gallarate Frogs: 1977–1983;
 Busto Arsizio Frogs: 1983–1986;
 Legnano Frogs: 1987–2000;
 Milano Frogs: 2001–2002;
 Gallarate Frogs: 2002–2003;
 Legnano Frogs: from 2003.

Honours
 Italian Bowl
 Champions: (6) 1984, 1987, 1988, 1989, 1994, 1995
 Coppa Italia
 Champions: (1) 1993
 Youngbowl
 Champions: (2) 1991, 1992
 Eurobowl
 Champions: (1) 1989

National tournaments

Championship

First division 

Source: Enciclopedia del Football (In Italian)

Second division 

Source: Enciclopedia del Football (In Italian)

Third division 

Source: Enciclopedia del Football (In Italian)

Coppa Italia 

Source: Enciclopedia del Football (In Italian)

Youth tournaments

Under-21 

Source: Enciclopedia del Football (In Italian)

Under-20 

Source: Enciclopedia del Football (In Italian)

Under-18 

Source: Enciclopedia del Football (In Italian)

Under-17 

Source: Enciclopedia del Football (In Italian)

International tournaments

European Football League 

Source: Enciclopedia del Football (In Italian)

Summary of the final stages played

Source: Enciclopedia del Football (In Italian)

MVP of the Italian Bowl
 Pier Paolo Gallivanone, MVP of the IV Italian Bowl;
 Robert Frasco, American import QB who played at San Jose State University and a stint in the NFL. 
 For the Frogs, Frasco was MVP of the VII, VIII and IX Italian Bowl; 
 Gianluca Orrigoni, MVP of the XIV Italian Bowl;
 Paolo Verrini, MVP of the XV Italian Bowl.

Frogs inducted into the Italian American Football Hall of Fame
 Pier Paolo Gallivanone, quarterback, MVP of the IV Italian Bowl, inducted in 2006;
 Luca Saguatti, linebacker, inducted in 2007.
 Robert Frasco, Quarterback inducted 2015

See also

American football
Busto Arsizio
Gallarate
Legnano

References

External links

1977 establishments in Italy
American football teams established in 1977
American football teams in Italy
Sport in Lombardy